

The Knoller D.I series 70 was a prototype fighter aircraft built in the Austro-Hungarian Empire during World War I for use by the Kaiserliche und Königliche Luftfahrtruppen (KuKLFT).

Variants
70.01 first prototype
70.02 second prototype
D.I planned production version (10 ordered, none built)

Specifications (70.01)

References

1910s Austro-Hungarian fighter aircraft
Knoller aircraft
Biplanes
Single-engined tractor aircraft
Aircraft first flown in 1917